The Wielbark culture or East Pomeranian-Mazovian is an Iron Age archaeological complex which flourished on the territory of today's Poland from the 1st century AD to the 5th century AD.

The Wielbark culture is associated with the Goths and related Germanic peoples, and played an important role in the Amber Road. It displays cultural links not only with its neighbours, but also with southern Scandinavia. The Wielbark culture replaced the preceding Oksywie culture on the lower Vistula in the 1st century AD, and subsequently expanded southwards at the expense of the Przeworsk culture, which is associated with the Vandals. This expansion has been associated by historians such as Peter Heather with the contemporary Marcomannic Wars. By the late 3rd century AD, the Wielbark culture had expanded into the area of the upper Dniester, where it possibly influenced the Chernyakhov culture to its south, which encompassed a large area between the Danube and the Don River.

In the 5th century AD, the Wielbark culture was replaced by the Sukow-Dziedzice group, which is associated with the Early Slavs.

Discovery
The Wielbark culture was named after the once-Prussian village, known in German as Willenberg, where a burial place with over 3,000 tombs, was discovered and partially recorded in 1873.

The "first modern description" of the culture was not until the work of Ryszard Wołągiewicz in the 1970s. The cemetery's completeness and long period of use was the reason this site was chosen to name the culture, which "spans all the phases of Wielbark culture as well as phases predating its emergence and thus dating to the earlier, pre-Roman period".

Many of the cemetery stones were moved, and many graves were damaged by the early discoverers, particularly during the Second World War.

Characteristics

Before 1 AD, when the Roman empire began to be more influential in northern Europe, there was relative consistency in burial practices between the Rhine and Vistula. Bodies were normally cremated and there were few grave goods, if any. This began to change, possibly reflecting increasing social stratification. The Wielbark culture, for example, is distinguished by its occasional use of monumental "barrow" burials.

The Wielbark culture is primarily differentiated from its predecessor the Oksywie culture by the introduction of inhumation as opposed to cremation, which began around 1 AD. Notably, the Wielbark culture used both rituals. Despite this, there is also evidence for continuity between the two cultures. This is interpreted as being caused by an evolution in spiritual culture.

The neighbouring Przeworsk culture, on the other hand, long continued to practice cremation, and whereas Wielbark burials never included weapons, Przeworsk burials often did. In the second century AD however, the burial practices of the Wielbark culture began to spread into Przeworsk areas.

Instead, the artifacts found are mostly ornaments and costumes, although a few graves have shown spurs, these being the only warrior attributes found. The people of the Wielbark culture used both inhumation and cremation techniques for burying their dead.

The Wielbark culture played an important role in the Amber Road. A complex series of wooden bridges and causeways built by the Wielbark culture were probably connected to this trade.

The Wielbark culture appears to have practiced mixed agriculture. Their lack of agricultural expertise made their fields less fertile, which caused to population to be quite mobile. Several settlements however remained stable for hundreds of years.

A characteristic of the Wielbark culture, which it had in common with southern Scandinavia, was the raising of stone covered mounds, stone circles, solitary stelae and variations of cobble cladding. These stone circles might have been places of communal meetings.

The Wielbark culture displays several characteristics similar to those of the Chernyakhov culture. This includes the creation of handmade bowl-shaped ceramics, the wearing by females of fibula brooches on each shoulder, the presence of Germanic longhouses, the practice of both cremation and inhumation, and the lack of weapons deposited in burials.

Another feature of the Wielbark culture was the use of bronze to make ornaments and accessories. Silver was used seldom and gold rarely. Iron appears to have been used extremely rarely. In 2000, in Czarnówko near Lębork, Pomerania, a cemetery of Oksywie and Wielbark cultures was found. These reached their height before the emigration of the population to the south began. A bronze kettle depicts males wearing the Suebian knot hairstyle.

History

The Wielbark culture emerged in the 1st century AD around the same area as the Oksywie culture, around the present day towns of Gdańsk and Chełmno. Whether the Wielbark culture was an outgrowth of the Oksywie culture or represents a new population is disputed. The increasing density of Wielbark centuries after its establishment suggests that it experienced significant population growth during its existence.

During the 1st and 2nd centuries AD, the Wielbark culture expanded into the lakelands (Kashubian and Krajenskian lakes) and stretched southwards, into the region around Poznań. Here it ejected the Przeworsk culture, which is often associated with the Vandals. Rather than being entirely replaced, archaeological evidence suggest that the Przeworks were to a certain extent absorbed by the Wielbark. The southward expansion of the Wielbark burial habits has been connected with the beginning of the Marcomannic Wars. By 200 AD, people of the Wielbark culture appear to have been recruited as soldiers in the Roman Army.

In the first half of the 3rd century AD, the Wielbark culture expanded southwards along the Vistula and Bug towards the upper Dniester. Meanwhile, Pomeranian settlements by the Baltic Sea were somewhat, but not entirely, abandoned. This expansion was swifter and on an even larger scale than previous ones, and represented a significant shift of Wielbark power towards the south. Archaeological and linguistics evidence suggest that the expansion involved both men, women and children. The Gothic attack on Histria in 238 is probably connected with this expansion. North of the Black Sea, the Wielbark culture played a decisive role in the formation of the Chernyakhov culture in the late 3rd century AD, which by the 4th century AD would cover a huge area between the Danube and the Don River. Though historically controversial, it is now universally accepted that the origins of the Chernyakhov culture lie primarily in the Wielbark culture, and that the former represents a culture dominated by the Goths and other Germanic peoples.

Isolated pockets of the Wielbark culture continued to exist in current northern Poland until the 5th century AD. From then it was replaced by the Sukow-Dziedzice group, which is associated with Early Slavs.

Ethnicity

The Wielbark culture has been described by archaeologists as a culture which continued both Germanic and non-Germanic people, which developed from the previous Oksywie material culture, with some influences from Scandinavia. Roman authors described the Gutones, Rugii and Lemovii as living in the same approximate area.

The Gutones have traditionally been equated to the ancestors of the Goths from Scandza (Scandinavia) to Gothiscandza as related in Jordanes' account of their origin. While such Scandinavian influence may well have played a part, the identical geographical extent and persistent use of Oksywie cemeteries suggest that the Wielbark Culture emerged from previous human settlements in the area, with new groups of Scandinavian immigrants making contributions to it as they arrived.

Based upon the accounts of Jordanes and Tacitus, many historians and archaeologists believe that the culture was politically dominated by the ancestors of the Goths, Rugii and Gepids who are later described in Roman and Greek sources further south, living north of the imperial border on the Danube. Along with the neighbouring Przeworsk culture, historian Peter Heather places it in the Germanic cultural horizon. In the past, the Wielbark culture was often connected with Early Slavs, but such theories have been dismissed by modern scholarship.

The cemeteries may give some indication in evidence as to which settlements could have been established directly by Goths. Barrow cemeteries on the Baltic Sea in Poland, which have raised stone circles, and solitary stelae next to them, reflect Scandinavian burial customs with a concentration in Gotland and Götaland. Appearing in the later 1st century, this type is found between the Vistula and the Kashubian and Krajenskian lakelands reaching into the Koszalin region.

Physical characteristics
Odontological analysis revealed that the Central European populations from the Roman period and the Early Middle Ages were indistinguishable in terms of non-metrical dental traits, though this does not exclude the possibility of genetically different origins.

Genetics
A genetic study published in PLOS One in 2014 examined and compared the mtDNA of the Wielbark culture and the Przeworsk culture, both belonging to the Roman Iron Age (RoIA) with that of populations from Poland in the Middle Ages. 24 samples of mtDNA from the Wielbark sites of Kowalewko (11) and Rogowo (13) were examined. Wielbark samples were found to be primarily carrying types of haplogroup H, while types of U and W were also frequent. It was found that the mtDNA of the RoiA populations was largely similar to that of medieval populations, although they displayed closer genetic relations to populations of northern and central Europe, while medieval populations on the other hand displayed closer genetic relations to Slavs of eastern and southern Europe. The mtDNA of the RoIA samples were found to be more closely related to Poles than any other modern population, while similarities with Balts and other West Slavs were also detected.

A genetic study published in Scientific Reports in 2018 examined the mtDNA of 60 individuals buried at the Wielbark cemetery of Kowalewko in the 1st and 2nd centuries AD. The majority of the individuals carried types of haplogroup H and U. Notably, they displayed higher frequencies of U5b (a typically Western Hunter-Gatherer lineage) than preceding and succeeding populations in the area. Compared to some ancient DNA samples, the male mitochondrial mix was found to be most closely related to Iron Age Jutland and late Neolithic Central European Bell Beaker culture samples. The females were most similar to Early-Middle Neolithic farmers. 

A genetic study published by the same author in Scientific Reports in 2019 examined the mtDNA of 27 individuals from a Wielbark cemetery in Masłomęcz, Poland. The remains were from the 2nd to 4th centuries AD. Based on archaeological evidence, these individuals were assumed to be Goths. They were found to be mostly carriers of haplogroup H and U. The individuals displayed even closer genetic links to Iron Age populations of southern Scandinavia than those of Kowalewko did. Males and females at Masłomęcz were more closely related to each other than those at Kowalewko. They also carried fewer samples of U5b, and displayed less strong genetic links to the Yamanya culture, Corded Ware culture, Bell Beaker culture and Unetice culture than earlier Wielbark samples from Kowalewko.

In a genetic study published in 2017, Polish researchers could successfully assign Y-DNA haplogroups to 16 individuals buried at the Kowalewko archeological site associated with the Wielbark culture.   In total, 8 out of 16 samples were assigned to haplogroup I1. Out of the samples dated to the Roman Iron Age, 3 samples belonged to haplogroup I1 under the subclade I1-L1237 of the I1-Z63 branch, one to R1b, and one to I2a2.

See also
Migrations of Wielbark and Przeworsk cultures people
Origins and expansion of the Wielbark culture
Wielbark culture and burials

Notes

References

Sources

Further reading

 

Archaeological cultures in Belarus
Archaeological cultures of Central Europe
Archaeological cultures of Eastern Europe
Archaeological cultures in Poland
Archaeological cultures in Ukraine
Iron Age cultures of Europe
Germanic archaeological cultures
Goths
Prehistoric Poland
Prehistory of Prussia